Jinx is the second studio album from American band Weekend. It was released in July 2013 under Slumberland Records.

Track list

References

2013 albums